IBU or Ibu may refer to:


Acronyms

Education
 International Buddhist University (Shitennoji University), in Habikino, Osaka Prefecture, Japan
 Istanbul Bilgi University, a for-profit university in Istanbul, Turkey

Sports
 International Biathlon Union, the international governing body of biathlon
 International Boxing Union (1911–1946), Paris, France
 International Boxing Union (since 1996), a professional boxing sanctioning body founded in Atlanta, Georgia, United States

Other acronyms
 IBU, Par Pharmaceutical brand name for ibuprofen
 Ibu-Tab and Ibu-Vivimed, Ibuprofen brand names
 IBU scale (International Bitterness Unit), measurement of bitterness in beer
 Inshore Boat Unit, a Naval Coastal Warfare unit of the United States Navy
 International Broadcasting Union, an alliance of European radio broadcasters
 Information Broadcast Unlimited, a Philippine radio and television network

Other uses
 Ibrahim Mohamed Solih (born 1964), a Maldivian politician known as Ibu
 Ibu language, a dialect of Sahu language
 Ibu Pertiwi, a national personification of Indonesia (Ibu meaning mother)
 Ibu River, a river in Nigeria that runs near Sagamu
 Mount Ibu, an active volcano in Indonesia

See also
 International Boxing Union (disambiguation)